Athletics was one of ten core sports that appeared at the 2018 Commonwealth Games in Gold Coast. As a founding sport, athletics has appeared consistently since its introduction at the 1911 Inter-Empire Games; the recognized precursor to the Commonwealth Games. The competition took place between Sunday 8–15 April 2018 at the Carrara Stadium.

The programme featured an expanded event set for para-athletes with a total of six men's and six women's events, re presenting doubling of the number para-events at the previous games. This move was approved of by the para-athletes, and Kailyn Joseph noted that inclusion in the medal table alongside able-bodied events allowed her to share in the same environment, as opposed to the separation found in the Paralympics and World Para Athletics Championships.

Two Indian athletes, racewalker Irfan Kolothum Thodi and triple jumper A.V. Rakesh Babu were removed from the games after a needle was found in their apartment, breaking games policy. A Singapore para-athlete, Mohammad Khairi Ishak, was withdrawn from the men's T47 100 m after failing a drug test prior to the competition. Other controversies of the athletics included the gold medal disqualification of Zharnel Hughes in the men's 200 m, after he impeded (eventual gold medallist) Jereem Richards, and the mid-race collapse of men's marathon leader Callum Hawkins.

Preparation
In preparation for hosting the Commonwealth Games Athletics events, the modified Carrara Stadium was used for the Australian Athletics Championships in February 2018.

The Australian Sports Anti-Doping Authority conducted a series of anti-doping tests in the months before the games. Australian sprinter Jessica Peris (daughter of former Commonwealth Games sprint champion Nova Peris) was among those to a fail doping test and she withdrew from the Australian trials event.

Schedule
Over the 10 days of competition there were 58 medal events including additional para-sport disciplines.

Medal summary

Medal table

Men

* Indicates the athlete only competed in the preliminary heats and received medals.

Men's para-sport

Women

Women's para-sport

Records 
 Broken Records in Athletics

References

External links
Athletics
Results Book – Athletics

 
2018
2018 Commonwealth Games events
Commonwealth Games
2018 Commonwealth Games
2018 Commonwealth Games